Stewart Township may refer to one of the following places:

In Canada

Stewart Township, Ontario, a geographic township in Nipissing District, Ontario

In the United States

Stewart Township, Barnes County, North Dakota
Stewart Township, Kidder County, North Dakota
Stewart Township, Fayette County, Pennsylvania
Stewart Township, Tripp County, South Dakota
 
See also

Stewart (disambiguation)

Township name disambiguation pages